Shaun T (born May 2, 1978) is an American fitness trainer. He is best known for his home fitness programs for adults and children which include T25, Insanity, Hip-Hop Abs, Cize and Let's Get Up!. He has now also turned to body building and competing.

Life and career 
Born as Shaun Thompson in Camden, New Jersey, he grew up in Philadelphia and was raised by his grandparents in Deptford Township, New Jersey, where he enjoyed football, baseball and running track as a student at Deptford Township High School. He received a bachelor's degree in exercise science from Rowan University where he also minored in theater and dance. He is a member of Alpha Phi Alpha fraternity. He lives in Phoenix, Arizona.

Personal life
Thompson has been openly gay since coming out at the age of 21 and is married to Scott Blokker. They are raising twin sons, born in November 2017.

See also 
 Beachbody

References

External links 
 Official website

1978 births
American television personalities
American gay men
LGBT African Americans
American LGBT broadcasters
Living people
People from Camden, New Jersey
People from Deptford Township, New Jersey
People from Phoenix, Arizona
Rowan University alumni
Infomercials